Ohio's 28th senatorial district has historically been based in metro Akron.  Currently it consists of a portion of Summit County.  It encompasses Ohio House districts 34, 35 and 36. It has a Cook PVI of D+14.  Its current Ohio Senator is Democrat Vernon Sykes.  He resides in Akron, a city located in Summit County.

List of senators

External links
Ohio's 28th district senator at the 133rd Ohio General Assembly official website

Ohio State Senate districts